The Mudhaffar Mosque is located in the center of the old part of the city of Taiz, Yemen. Built in the thirteenth century, the mosque is part of the oldest functioning public bath in Yemen. It is one of the two beautiful mosques in Yemen. It is one of the largest mosques of the old city and many of the residents attend the Friday prayers (Jumu'ah) there. The mosque was also home to a madrassa (Islamic school) that educated many Islamic scholars. Visitors from rural areas often traveled to use the mosque's baths, either for healing or as a ritual before a wedding.

See also
 Islam in Yemen
 List of mosques in Yemen

References

Mosques in Yemen
Taiz